Harry Allen Wolfgang Smith (December 19, 1907—February 24, 1976) was an American journalist, humorist, and writer whose books were popular in the 1940s and 1950s.

Family and early career 
Smith was born in McLeansboro, Illinois, where he lived until the age of six. His family moved to Decatur in 1913 and then to Defiance, Ohio, finally arriving in Huntington, Indiana. It was at this point Smith dropped out of high school and began working odd jobs, eventually finding work as a journalist.

He began in 1922 at the Huntington Press, relocating to Jeffersonville, Indiana, and Louisville, Kentucky. In Florida, editing the Sebring American in 1925, he met society editor Nelle Mae Simpson, and they married in 1927. The couple lived in Oklahoma, where Smith worked at the Tulsa Tribune, followed by a position at the Denver Post. In 1929, he became a United Press rewrite man, also handling feature stories and celebrity interviews. He continued as a feature writer with the New York World-Telegram from 1934 to 1939.

World War II bestsellers
He found fame when his humor book Low Man on a Totem Pole (1941) became a bestseller during WWII, popular not only on the home front but also read on troop trains and at military camps. Featuring an introduction by his friend Fred Allen, it eventually sold over a million copies. Damon Runyon called it, "Rich funny stuff, loaded with laughs." As noted by Eric Partridge in A Dictionary of Catch Phrases, the book's title became a catchphrase for the least successful individual in a group.

With his newfound financial freedom, he left the daily newspaper grind for life as a freelance author, scripting for radio while also writing (for six months) The Totem Pole, a daily column for United Features Syndicate, making personal appearances and working on his next book, Life in a Putty Knife Factory (1943), which became another bestseller. He spent eight months in Hollywood as a screenwriter for Paramount Pictures, and wrote about the experience in Lost in the Horse Latitudes (1944). His first three books were widely circulated around the world in Armed Services Editions. The popularity of these titles kept Smith on the New York Herald Tribune'''s Best Seller List for 100 weeks and prompted a collection of all three in 3 Smiths in the Wind (1946). By the end of World War II, Smith's fame as a humorist was such that he edited Desert Island Decameron (1945), a collection of essays and stories by such leading humorists as Dorothy Parker, Robert Benchley and James Thurber. Histories of the Manhattan Project mention Desert Island Decameron because Donald Hornig was reading it when he was sitting in the Trinity Test tower babysitting the atomic bomb on July 15, 1945, the stormy night prior to the first nuclear explosion.

Later writing
His novel, Rhubarb (1946), about a cat that inherits a professional baseball team, led to two sequels and a 1951 film adaptation. Larks in the Popcorn (1948, reprinted in 1974) and Let The Crabgrass Grow (1960) described "rural" life in Westchester County, New York. People Named Smith (1950) offers anecdotes and histories of people named Smith, such as Presidential candidate Al Smith, religious leader Joseph Smith and a man named 5/8 Smith. He collaborated with Ira L. Smith on the baseball anecdotes in Low and Inside (1949) and  Three Men on Third (1951). The Compleat Practical Joker (1953, reprinted in 1980) detailed the practical jokes pulled by his friends Hugh Troy, publicist Jim Moran and other pranksters, such as the artist Waldo Peirce. His futuristic fantasy novel, The Age of the Tail (1955), describes a time when people are born with tails. One of his last books was Rude Jokes (1970).

Smith also wrote hundreds of magazine articles for Esquire, Holiday, McCall's, Playboy, Reader's Digest, The Saturday Evening Post, The Saturday Review of Literature, True, Venture, Golf and other publications. Smith made a number of appearances on radio and television. Fred Allen was one of his friends, and he was a guest on The Fred Allen Show on December 7, 1947 and January 9, 1949. On June 28, 1959, he was interviewed by Edward R. Murrow on Person to Person.

Smith's autobiography, To Hell in a Handbasket, was published in 1962. H. Allen and Nelle Smith lived in Mount Kisco, New York, for 23 years before relocating to Alpine, Texas, in 1967. He died in San Francisco, and his last book, The Life and Legend of Gene Fowler, was published posthumously in 1977. His papers are in special collections at Sul Ross State University (Alpine, Texas) and Southern Illinois University (Carbondale, Illinois). The SIU photograph collection contains pictures of Smith, his family, friends and celebrities.

Chili champ
Allen competed with Wick Fowler in the first Chili Cookoff in history, held in Terlingua, Texas in October 1967. The competition ended in a tie.  According to his book, The Great Chili Confrontation, three judges sampled the chili.  Smith and Fowler received one vote each with a third judge uttering a decision that was undiscernable to either competitors or attendees. Smith competed with the following recipe:

Smith claimed to have downed the first legal drink in the United States once prohibition was repealed with the Twenty-first Amendment to the United States Constitution, and he wrote about the incident in Chapter VI of Life in a Putty Knife Factory. However, others also claimed to have taken the first Repeal drink; in New York City, Joe Weber of the comedy team Weber and Fields took the first legal drink with several reporters as his witnesses.

References

 Additional sources 
Southern Illinois University/Morris Library Collection: Photos of H. Allen Smith (1925-76)
Southern Illinois University/Morris Library Collection of Smith's manuscripts and papers (82 boxes)
Sul Ross Library: Elton Miles collection with H. Allen Smith interview

 External links 
H. Allen Smith's "Nobody Knows More About Chili Than I Do"

Smith, H. Allen (Harry Allen), (1907-1976.) | Southern Illinois University Special Collections Research Center
H. Allen Smith on Kukla, Fran and Ollie

LibraryThing author profile
Gene Curtis, "The Dream House of H. Allen Smith", Texas Monthly'', February 1976 (excerpt available at Google Books).

1907 births
1976 deaths
American humorists
American male journalists
People from McLeansboro, Illinois
People from Huntington, Indiana
20th-century American non-fiction writers
Journalists from Illinois
20th-century American male writers
People from Defiance, Ohio
20th-century American journalists